Miltochrista delineata is a moth of the family Erebidae. It was described by Francis Walker in 1854. It is found in Shanghai and Hong Kong in China.

The wingspan is 26–33 mm.

References

 

delineata
Moths described in 1854
Moths of Asia
Moths of Taiwan